"Ar Lan y Môr" ("Beside the Sea")  is a traditional Welsh folk song. Various forms of the text exist, including some where the metre and subject of some verses suggest insertions from other unrelated songs. The song is a love song. As with many other Welsh songs, there are alternative words set to the same tune.

"Ar Lan y Môr" has been frequently recorded. Notably, the song features on the first Welsh-language concept album, Endaf Emlyn's Salem (1974). A rendition appears on the only comedy album to top the UK Albums Chart to date, Max Boyce's We All Had Doctors' Papers (1975). The song also appears on Ar Log's eponymous 1978 debut album, Bryn Terfel's album We'll Keep a Welcome (2000) and Katherine Jenkins' debut album Première (2004).

Versions: Welsh and English

References

External links 
Youtube version
 English and Welsh versions
  variant version, English differs significantly
 Alternative words
 Welsh only

Welsh folk songs
British folk songs
Year of song unknown
Songwriter unknown